The Donald Gray Memorial Cup is the premier men's football competition in Southland, New Zealand. It sits below the FootballSouth Premier League and above Southland Division 1.

Current clubs
As of 2022 season.

(2) — Denotes club's second team

Past winners
List of winners from 1950-2009
List of winners from 2003–

 1950 - Brigadiers
 1951 - Brigadiers
 1952 - Brigadiers
 1953 - Brigadiers & Thistle FC
 1954 - Brigadiers
 1955 - Thistle FC
 1956 - Brigadiers
 1957 - Hotspurs
 1958 - Brigadiers
 1959 - Invercargill Rovers
 1960 - Thistle FC
 1961 - Thistle FC
 1962 - Thistle FC
 1963 - Thistle FC
 1964 - Thistle FC
 1965 - Thistle FC
 1966 - Thistle FC
 1967 - Invercargill United
 1968 - Invercargill United
 1969 - Thistle FC
 1970 - Thistle FC
 1971 - Thistle FC
 1972 - Thistle FC & Invercargill United
 1973 - Thistle FC
 1974 - Southland Boys' High School
 1975 - Southland Boys' High School
 1976 - Thistle FC
 1977 - Thistle FC
 1978 - Queens Park AFC
 1979 - Old Boys' AFC
 1980 - Invercargill United
 1981 - Invercargill United
 1982 - Thistle FC
 1983 - Gore Wanderers
 1984 - Thistle FC
 1985 - Old Boys' AFC
 1986 - Waihopai
 1987 - Southland Marist
 1988 - Old Boys' AFC
 1989 - Queens Park AFC
 1990 - Thistle FC
 1991 - Invercargill United
 1992 - Queens Park AFC
 1993 - Thistle FC
 1994 - Queenstown Rovers
 1995 - Queenstown Rovers
 1996 - Queenstown Rovers
 1997 - Invercargill United
 1998 - Southend United
 1999 - Queenstown Rovers
 2000 - Queenstown Rovers
 2001 - Waihopai
 2002 - Waihopai
 2003 - Waihopai
 2004 - Queens Park AFC
 2005 - Southend United
 2006 - Queens Park AFC
 2007 - Southend United
 2008 - Queens Park AFC
 2009 - Old Boys' AFC
 2010 - Old Boys' AFC
 2011 - Old Boys' AFC
 2012 - Old Boys' AFC
 2013 - Southend United
 2014 - Old Boys' AFC
 2015 - Queenstown Rovers
 2016 - Old Boys' AFC
 2017 - Gore Wanderers
 2018 - Gore Wanderers
 2019 - Old Boys' AFC
 2020 - Queens Park AFC
2021 - Queens Park AFC
2022 - Thistle FC

References

External links
Southland Football

Association football leagues in New Zealand